Leucrocuta jewetti is a species of flatheaded mayfly in the family Heptageniidae. It is found in southeastern Canada and the northwestern United States.

References

Mayflies
Articles created by Qbugbot
Insects described in 1966